Nižić is a Croatian surname. Notable people with the surname include:

Danijel Nizic (born 1995), Australian footballer
Zoran Nižić (born 1989), Croatian footballer

Croatian surnames
Slavic-language surnames
Patronymic surnames